Credicorp is the leading financial services holding company in Peru, with presence in Colombia, Bolivia, Chile, Panama and the United States. It currently has a consolidated universal banking, insurance and pension platform that serves all segments of the Peruvian population, complemented by a significant presence in microfinance, investment banking and wealth management in Latin America. It has around 20 million customers internationally.

Its main operating subsidiaries are Banco de Crédito del Perú (BCP), Mibanco, BCP Bolivia, Atlantic Security Bank (ASB), Grupo Pacífico Seguros, Prima AFP, and Credicorp Capital, brands which are the most valued in Peru. Credicorp has four lines of business: universal banking, microfinance, insurance and pensions, and investment banking and wealth management. In addition, through Krealo, the innovative arm of the corporation, it creates, invests in and manages fintechs and startups in Latin America.

Credicorp was established in 1995 through the acquisition of the majority of the common shares of Banco de Crédito del Perú, Atlantic Security Holding Co. and Pacífico Seguros. The company was then listed on the New York Stock Exchange and the common shares have been traded there ever since.

Foundation and expansion

Credicorp was founded in 1995 after acquiring the common shares of Banco de Crédito del Perú (BCP), Atlantic Security Holding Corporation and Pacífico Compañía de Seguros y Reaseguros S.A.: 90.1%, 98.2% and 75.8%, respectively. The shares began trading on the New York Stock Exchange after the Exchange Offering. In 1996, Credicorp acquired the remaining 1.8% of the shares of Atlantic Security Holding Corporation.

In 2012, Credicorp executes a regional expansion plan based on investment banking and asset management: it acquires the majority of the shares of Correval (Colombia) and IM Trust (Chile), thus forming the company known today as Credicorp Capital. In 2019, Ultraserfinco was acquired in Colombia.

Today, Credicorp has around 20 million clients at an international level in its different operations. Additionally, it has more than 36 thousand employees serving more than 10 million clients in universal banking, more than 2 million in microfinance, around 5 million clients in insurance and 2.4 million members in the pension business line.

External links
Official website

Companies listed on the New York Stock Exchange
Financial services companies of Peru
Financial services companies established in 1995
Peruvian brands